Blitz: The League is an American football video game developed and published by Midway Games as an extension of their NFL Blitz series. It was released in October 2005 for the PlayStation 2 and Xbox after the National Football League (NFL) signed an exclusive licensing deal with Electronic Arts. Lawrence Taylor, who provides voice acting for the game, served as its official spokesman.

A second version of the game was released on the Xbox 360 in 2006–2007. The version was banned in Australia. In December 2006, a portable version titled Blitz: Overtime was released on the PlayStation Portable. These versions included the voicework and likeness of former NFL linebacker Bill Romanowski. The game was originally intended to be a Wii launch title, but the version was delayed and eventually canceled.

Gameplay

Since Midway Games no longer had an NFL license, Blitz: The League focuses on a fictional league consisting of 18 teams known simply as "The League", whose history is written as a tongue-in-cheek parallel of the NFL's, with the league consisting of three divisions, using a system of promotion and relegation. The game also brings back the hard-hitting and violent gameplay of earlier Blitz games. Former NFL linebacker Lawrence Taylor voices Quentin Sands, captain of the New York Nightmare. In the next iteration released in 2006, former NFL linebacker Bill Romanowski voices Bruno Battaglia, the captain of the Baltimore Bearcats.

Blitz: The League is very similar to previous installments in the Blitz series, as it depicts an aggressive and violent version of gridiron football. Like previous games in the series, first downs are awarded at 30 yards, not 10; there are eight men to a side (similar to arena football, not 11 as in American football); penalties and referees do not exist (although players are somehow prohibited from going offsides); and overly vicious tackles and blocking are the norm. On gaining yards, making tackles for a loss, scoring, or forcing turnovers, players are rewarded with an increased "Clash" meter. When the "Clash" meter is charged up, players may perform "dirty" stiff-arms, dodges, rush avoidance (for quarterbacks) or, most importantly, "dirty hits" on defense. Performing a "dirty" hit or stiff-arm causes opposing players to lose stamina (in essence, reducing their effectiveness) and occasionally become injured (an image of an x-ray would zoom into a specific bone and show it snap, show a ligament tearing, or depict a different brutal injury). After successfully performing a number of "Clash" moves (or forcing turnovers and scoring touchdowns), players can perform "Unleash" moves which are nearly unstoppable.

When an injury occurs, the player may choose to "treat" the injury normally, or "juice" the injury (inject an athlete with steroids). "Juicing" causes an injury to be ignored, but increases the risk of more severe injuries. Some other injuries, such as kneecap fracture, torn ACL, wrist fracture, and ruptured Achilles, are more serious and cannot be juiced.

Campaign mode
In the single-player campaign mode, the player is challenged to win championships in all three divisions of the fictitious American football championship known simply as "The League". The player begins by creating a new team, designing its uniforms and choosing a team name, then picks one of three defensive veterans and one of three offensive rookies as team captains.

The player must win seven of ten regular-season games in each division, followed by a division championship. The player needs to decide on a training program for each team member, which gradually increases the member's skills. Money is earned for each game based on performance, "dirty hits" performed, etc., and can also earn additional money for "gambling" on the results of a game. With this money, the player may purchase superior equipment, training facilities, and drugs (some legal, some not) that can be used to augment performance.

In "Campaign" mode, the player is also periodically shown cutscenes illustrating a variety of subplots involving the team. The game begins at the end of the previous season, when Quentin Sands of the New York Nightmare lands a devastating, career-ending hit on the player's team's star quarterback, similar to Taylor's sack of Washington Redskins quarterback Joe Theismann during the 1985 NFL season, which broke Theismann's leg and ended his career, as the team is demoted to Division 3. As the game progresses, the player learns that the veteran captain has returned to the game as a result of financial troubles, while the rookie is portrayed as a naive yet talented individual whom Sands has targeted as the next player whose career he'll end on the field.

The story of the "Campaign" mode was partially written by former writers of Playmakers, a controversial show on the ESPN network that was canceled due to the NFL's objections to its portrayal of professional football players. Like in the series, the pro circuit chronicled in the game is simply referred to as "The League".

Also, before every game in "Campaign" mode, a cutscene showcasing the opposing team and its star player plays, wherein the coach lays out the game plan for how best to play against the opponents' offense, defense or occasionally, star player in order to win, adding an element of strategy to each game.

Campaign mode plot

Opening
The storyline begins during the closing moments of the previous season's final game, where the player-created team is trailing the New York Nightmare. During the closing seconds, the player's team makes one final play to win the game, but the quarterback is sacked and injured by Quentin Sands, ending his career. The loss bumps the player's team down to Division III, while the Nightmare go up to Division I.

After the game, Lyman Strang, the owner of the player's team, unveils his new stadium plan to Sheila Andrews, the mayor of the team's city. She initially refuses to support the bond measure, believing it would screw voters who would have to pay heavy taxes to support a losing team. Strang makes a bet with Mayor Andrews that if the team wins the League Championship, she would support the bond measure. If the team fails to win, Strang will make a large donation to Andrews' reelection fund.

Strang orders a complete overhaul of the team, choosing a new nickname, color scheme, logo, and personnel. All of these are left to the individual player. After choosing the aesthetics of the team, the player chooses a new coach, new offensive and defensive coordinator, a rookie offensive player, veteran defensive player, and a new team doctor. The player is given a choice of three candidates on each position, each emphasizing strengths in some areas and weaknesses in others, or containing a balance without leanings for one particular area.

Division 3
The player's team sets out to make its mark in Division 3. Initially, attendance at home games is low, and even Mayor Andrews refuses to take the team seriously. She comments on the veteran's presence, thinking he has retired from the previous season. Strang explains that his extravagant lifestyle has caught up to him, and he needs the money. He is later seen begging Strang for an increase in pay under his contract due to a messy divorce that saw his ex-wife take a large amount of his fortune, and demand high alimony. He is also revealed to have made bad stock investments, as he is seen frustrated that a stock has tanked.

The rookie, meanwhile, discovers that Jacqui, the team's head cheerleader, went to the same college as him (Northern University). They begin talking in between plays, but are reluctant to date each other due to The League's strict prohibitions on player-cheerleader interactions.

The team manages to make the Division 3 Championship against the Arizona Outlaws. While the veteran does not believe that winning the "Scrub Division" is much of an accomplishment, the rest of the team is thrilled. The victory allows iRiver to seek out and purchase the naming rights to the current stadium, and make improvements to it. The victory also gives the team added financial success, which Strang uses to sign Bruno Battaglia, the now-former captain of the Baltimore Bearcats, to the team, despite the coach's objection.

Division 2
The team continues its success in Division 2. The veteran's problems continue to mount, as he receives notice from a collection agency that payments on his car are past due. Following a home game against the Minnesota Reapers, he finds a boot attached to his car in the parking lot. At this point, the veteran calls his bookie on a cell phone to place a bet on a college game, showing that his woes are also largely due to a gambling problem. Mayor Andrews, however, invites the veteran into her limousine, and they work out a deal for him to star in a commercial promoting the city. It is also implied that Andrews and the veteran have undertaken a sexual relationship.

The addition of Battaglia has proven to cause friction in the locker room, particularly with the rookie. The rookie finds Battaglia hitting on Jacqui after a game, and she explains that they know each other from their previous time in The League (hinting that Jacqui may have been a Bearcats cheerleader at one point). The rookie is flustered, and refuses to speak to Jacqui for some time.

Despite these problems, the team continues its winning ways, defeating the Reapers in the Division 2 Championship Game. iRiver provides more money to even further improve the existing stadium. In the Xbox 360 version, the team is also able to acquire former team captain Tito Maas from the Outlaws. Attendance picks up, and the stadium bond measure gains support.

Division 1
The team's arrival in Division 1 is beset by problems almost from the start. While at a nightclub celebrating their win in the Division 2 Championship, Mayor Andrews catches the veteran flirting with another woman at the club. The team also runs into the New York Nightmare, who have arrived in town for the next night's game, as well as to film a beer commercial, which, according to Quentin Sands, "only real teams get to do". Sands mocks the team for its inexperience in Division 1, and personally insults the rookie saying he is not man enough to satisfy Jacqui. This leads the rookie to attack Sands, sparking a brawl between the two teams.

The player's entire team is arrested, and it is only Strang's pleading that the city would lose money from its biggest game in history that convinces Andrews to bail the team out. She refuses to release the veteran, as she is still angry at what she saw him doing in the club. The game against the Nightmare is also disastrous, as Sands lays a dirty, late hit on the rookie, tearing his MCL. At this point, he is expected to be out for the rest of the season. The rookie, however, returns when the team plays the Nightmare on the road (although, when playing the game, this can be avoided). The late hit always comes in the second quarter. The player's rookie will not be taken out, although it's pretty difficult to win against the Nightmare with only whatever points the player can score in the first quarter.

When the veteran is released from jail, his problems begin anew. No longer in Andrews' good graces, he once again finds himself deep in debt. When lifting weights alone in the team workout room, his bookies enter, press a barbell against his throat, and threaten his life if he is unable to come up with the money.

The team manages to make the League Championship Game against the Nightmare. The night before the game, the veteran, desperate to pay his debts, meets with Sands in a club, and secretly sells him his copy of the team's playbook. He informs his bookie that he has the money, but wishes to bet it on the championship game. During the game, Sands expresses surprise that none of the team's plays appear in the book. He quickly realizes that the copy the veteran sold him was fake. The team goes on to defeat the Nightmare and become League Champions.

Ending
The team is shown celebrating in the locker room. The veteran decides to stick around and play for a few more years. The rookie reconciles with Jacqui, who is willing to lose her job to be with him. The stadium bond measure is revealed to have passed, but Strang's proposition of a celebratory three-way with Mayor Andrews and another woman are shot down by both women.

Release
On July 20, 2005, Midway Games Inc. announced Lawrence Taylor will become the official cover athlete for the video game, who would also act as the voice and personality of the game's main character/athlete, Quentin Sands.

The Xbox 360 version, which had been planned for release in Australia on February 23, 2007 (the day before its European release date), was refused classification by the country's Office of Film and Literature Classification, effectively banning the game there. The reason for the ban was that the use of drugs was related to incentives and rewards. Blitz: The League, Blitz: The League II, and Mutant Football League are the only professional football games ever to receive the "Mature" rating from the ESRB.

Reception

The PlayStation 2 and Xbox versions received "generally favorable reviews", while the Xbox 360 version and Blitz: Overtime received "mixed or average reviews", according to the review aggregation website Metacritic.

The most common critical complaints with Blitz revolved around allegations of "rubberband AI"; that is, in single-player mode, the computer opponent becomes nearly unbeatable late in games with the human player leading. But many critics also pointed out that rubberband AI is also an undocumented feature of more "legitimate" football titles such as the Madden NFL series. The PlayStation 2 and PlayStation Portable releases were also criticized for their very long delays and load times.

Detroit Free Press gave the PS2 version three stars out of four: "Solid graphics, online play and original in-your-face features make Blitz: The League a great alternative to the other football games on the market". Maxim gave the PS2 and Xbox version four stars out of five: "[Do you] Crave a purer form of pigskin, where painkillers and cheap shots aren’t just overlooked but encouraged? Then give this ballsy baller a try". However, Charles Herold of The New York Times gave the same console versions an average review: "While it is frustratingly easy to throw an incomplete pass and slow-mo didn't always respond when I tried to trigger it, when it worked right I would leap up from my couch and start screaming in excitement as my quarterback nimbly tossed the ball down the field to a receiver who spun away from one opponent, crashed through another and raced down an open field".

The game sold 350,000 units by December 2005.

See also
Blitz: The League II
All-Pro Football 2K8
Madden NFL 06

References

External links
Midway Games page: B:TL, B:TL360, B:O

2005 video games
American football video games
Cancelled Wii games
Censored video games
Midway video games
Multiplayer and single-player video games
NFL Blitz video games
Obscenity controversies in video games
PlayStation 2 games
PlayStation Portable games
RenderWare games
Video games developed in the United States
Xbox games
Xbox 360 games